Lutsk Raion is a raion in Volyn Oblast in western Ukraine. Its administrative center is the city of Lutsk. Population: 

On 18 July 2020, as part of the administrative reform of Ukraine, the number of raions of Volyn Oblast was reduced to four, and the area of Lutsk Raion was significantly expanded.  The January 2020 estimate of the raion population was

See also
 Administrative divisions of Volyn Oblast
 Korshov, a village in Lutsk Raion

References

External links
 lutskadm.gov.ua 

Raions of Volyn Oblast
1966 establishments in Ukraine